Ali-Mohammad Gharbiani is an Iranian engineer and reformist politician who formerly represented Ardabil, Nir, Namin and Sareyn electoral district in the Iranian Parliament during the second, third, fourth and sixth terms and also served as the former governor of West Azerbaijan province is from 1997 to 1998.

References

Islamic Association of Engineers of Iran politicians
Members of the 6th Islamic Consultative Assembly
Members of the 2nd Islamic Consultative Assembly
Members of the 3rd Islamic Consultative Assembly
Members of the 4th Islamic Consultative Assembly
Governors of West Azerbaijan Province
Deputies of Ardabil, Nir, Namin and Sareyn
Secretaries-General of political parties in Iran
Rotating Presidents of the Council for Coordinating the Reforms Front
Assembly of the Forces of Imam's Line politicians
Living people
Year of birth missing (living people)